The State flag of Oman consists of a horizontal tricolor of white, red and green with a vertical red stripe on the left that contains the national emblem of Oman (Khanjar and two swords).

Until 1975, Oman used the plain red banner of the indigenous people.  In 1970, the Sultan introduced a complete new set of national flags. Bands of green and white were added to the fly, and the national emblem, the badge of the Albusaidi Dynasty, was placed in the canton. This depicts crossed swords over a khanjar, a traditional curved dagger. White has been associated historically with the Imam, the religious leader of Oman, and at times the political rival to the ruling Sultan. It also symbolizes peace. Green is traditionally associated with the Jabal al-Akdar, or "Green Mountains," which lie toward the north of the country. Red is a common color in Gulf state flags. The national emblem is said to date back to the 18th century. A curved dagger is fastened over a pair of crossed swords. An ornate horsebit links the weapons.

Between 1970 and 1995, the size of the middle band of the triband was slimmer than the other two, making up approximately one fifth of its height, the other bands two-fifths.

The naval ensign shows an azure (blue) field, with the Oman in the canton or top-left quarter and the naval service emblem in the fly.

The standard of the Sultan of Oman is red with a green border whose width is about one-sixth of the height of the flag, surrounded by a red border of about the same width. It bears the country's emblem as a charge in the center, colored gold.

Gallery

References

External links

Oman
Oman
Oman
National symbols of Oman
Oman
Oman